The Karot Hydropower Project is an under-construction concrete-core rockfill gravity large dam in Pakistan, with a planned installed capacity of 720 MW. The project is sponsored by Chinese state-owned company China Three Gorges Corporation (CTG). 

It is the first investment project of the Silk Road Fund, and is part of the much larger China–Pakistan Economic Corridor (CPEC). 

The plant is expected to be completed in April 2022. Construction works were 88% complete as of May 2021.

Location
The Karot Hydropower Project is planned on Jhelum River near Karot village, some 1.7 kilometers upstream of Karot Bridge and 74 km upstream of Mangla Dam. The Project site is accessible through the Islamabad – Kahuta – Kotli road, approximately 29 kilometers from Kahuta, and 65 kilometers from Islamabad.

History
The Jhelum River is the largest river of Indus Basin River System, and its hydropower potential was identified by various studies carried out by international agencies, with the first report issued by the Canadian Consultant group MONENCO in 1983, followed by a 1994 study by the German Agency for Technical Cooperation (GTZ) that formally proposed the Karot Hydropower Project.

On September 28, 2016, the federal and Azad Jammu and Kashmir governments signed an implementation agreement with a Chinese consortium for development and operation on river Jhelum at a levelised tariff of 7.57 cents per unit for 30 years. Financial close of the project was achieved in February 2017 while land acquisition award has also been done. 

Groundbreaking on the project took place on January 10, 2016. Construction works were 25% complete as of September 2017, 70% as of January 2020 and 88% as of May 2021.The project has successfully commissioned on June 29, 2022.

Project details
The major project features include construction of concrete gravity 95.5 meters high dam with a crest length of 320 meters near the village of Gohra. The dam's reservoir will be approximately 164.5 million cubic meters in volume, with a length of 27 kilometers. 72 homes and 58 businesses are expected to require relocation as a result of construction,  while 2.8 kilometers of the Karot-Kotli road, and 8.9 kilometers of the Azad Pattan-Kahuta road will need relocation.

The power intake structure will be constructed on right bank of the river immediately upstream of Dam site and will divert the water into headrace tunnels entering into Cavern Powerhouse. The water will be discharged back to River Jhelum through tail-race channel located at right bank of the River Jhelum immediately downstream of Karot village. The dam will generate mean annual energy 3,436 GWh, and will connect to Pakistan's national electricity grid.

SMEC International Pty Ltd is participating as Employer's Engineer, who is providing services for project management, design review and construction supervision for 720 MW Karot hydropower project

Financing
The Karot project is being developed by Karot Power Company comprising Three Gorges South Asia Investment Limited, a subsidiary of China Three Gorges Corporation, China-CTGC and Associated Technologies of Pakistan. 

Total costs for the project are estimated to be $2 billion, and will be funded by International Finance Corporation, China's Silk Road Fund. The Export-Import Bank of China and China Development Bank will issue loans to the Karot Power Company. It will be built on a "Build-Own-Operate-Transfer" basis for 30 years, after which ownership will be turned over to the government of Pakistan.

After completion, the company will run and maintain the project for 30 years at a levelised tariff of 7.57 cents per unit after which it will be transferred to the Punjab government at a notional price of Rs.1.

References

Hydroelectric power stations in Pakistan
Rawalpindi District
China–Pakistan Economic Corridor
Dams in Punjab, Pakistan
Dams under construction
Dams on the Jhelum River
Rock-filled dams